Gurule is a surname. Notable people with the surname include:

Delfina Gurule (1883–1979), owner of Delfina Gurule House in Albuquerque, New Mexico, U.S.
Jimmy Gurulé (born 1951), American attorney, academic and government official
Martin Gurule (1969–1998), American prisoner